Bradysia similigibbosa is a species of fungus gnat from New Caledonia.

References

Sciaridae
Insects described in 2013
Insects of New Caledonia